There are many local stopping places on the Manx Electric Railway on the Isle of Man. Trams may stop wherever it is convenient to do so.

Following is a list of the acknowledged stopping places. The primary (i.e. timetabled) stopping places are as follows, and are those featured on the timetabled services of the railway. The principal stopping points, however, are at Groudle, Laxey and the northern terminus at Ramsey and the following places in between.

Principal stops

Other stopping places

In addition to official stations which appear on the timetables, there are also a number of unofficial stopping points and request stops, more recently denoted by the addition of "bus stop" style signs during the late 1990s; prior to this the halts were not demarcated on the line. These can be found along the line at such locations as the former holiday camp at Howstrake, the Liverpool Arms (Halfway House, now known as Balladromma Beg) and Ballure Road. This is not an exhaustive list of every stopping point on the line, however. Trams may stop at virtually any point on the line and double track operation ensures that collisions are avoided. There are crossing points along the line, primarily at the timetabled stopping points, though many are now disused.

References

Sources
 Manx Electric Railway Stopping Places (2002) Manx Electric Railway Society
 Island Images: Manx Electric Railway Pages (2003) Jon Wornham
 Official Tourist Department Page (2009) Isle Of Man Heritage Railways

 
Stations